The Blue 9 (Plavi 9) is a 1950 Croatian football comedy film. The film was directed by Krešo Golik.

That film is a bizarre mixture of the Soviet-style industrial epic, romantic comedy and football film. It is famous for superbly directed football sequences. After release it quickly became the biggest hit of then-young Yugoslav cinema.

This film is first Croatian movie with sport as the main topic. The Blue 9 is also first Croatian comedy film from sound era.

Movie was filmed on the locations in Croatia (Split, Rijeka and Zagreb) and in Serbia (Belgrade).

External links 

 Hrvatski film online Plavi 9
 Hrvatski film online Krešo Golik

Plavi 9

1950 films
Association football films
1950s Croatian-language films
1950s sports comedy films
Films directed by Krešo Golik
Films shot in Croatia
Jadran Film films
Croatian comedy films
Croatian black-and-white films
Yugoslav comedy films
1950 comedy films
Films set in Yugoslavia
Films set in Croatia
Films set in Belgrade
Films shot in Belgrade